Anton Olehovych Dukach (born 30 July 1995 in Lviv, Ukraine) is a Ukrainian luger.

Career
At the 2012 Winter Youth Olympics in Innsbruck, Austria, Anton Dukach finished 4th in boys' singles having lost 0.022 sec to German athlete who was third. He was 7th in team relay (together with Stetskiv, Buryy, and Lehedza). He was also the flagbearer of Ukraine at the Games.

Dukach's first World Cup season was the 2012-13 season. As of February 2022, Dukach's best Luge World Cup finish was 15th in the 2019-20 season in Sigulda, Latvia, both in singles and sprint races.

Dukach participated at several World Championships, with his best personal result being 20th in 2021.

On 27 December 2017 Dukach qualified for the 2018 Winter Olympics. At the Olympics, he finished 23rd in singles' race and 13th in team relay (together with Shkhumova, Obolonchyk, and Zakharkiv).

In 2022, Anton Dukach was nominated for his second Winter Games in Beijing.

Personal life
Dukach studied computer security at Lviv Polytechnic. His hobbies are football and music.

Career results

Winter Olympics

World Championships

European Championships

Luge World Cup

Rankings

References

External links
 
 

1995 births
Living people
Ukrainian male lugers
Olympic lugers of Ukraine
Lugers at the 2012 Winter Youth Olympics
Lugers at the 2018 Winter Olympics
Lugers at the 2022 Winter Olympics
Sportspeople from Lviv